Waterford Township is a township in Clinton County, Iowa, USA.  As of the 2000 census, its population was 796.

History
Waterford Township was organized in April, 1854. It was first called Henry Township, and the name was changed to its present form in May of that year.

Geography
According to the USGS, it contains six cemeteries: Assumption, Glahn, Gohlmann, Immaculate Conception, McClure and Saint Josephs.

The streams of Honey Creek, Williams Creek, Williams Creek and Willow Creek run through this township.

Notes

References
 USGS Geographic Names Information System (GNIS)

External links
 US-Counties.com
 City-Data.com

Townships in Clinton County, Iowa
Townships in Iowa
1854 establishments in Iowa
Populated places established in 1854